Charlie Babcock (born 1979) is an American actor born in Grosse Pointe, Michigan as Charles William Babcock. Babcock has guest starred on several present-day television programs which include a recurring role on the ABC series Desperate Housewives as Stu who was Lynette Scavo's assistant at Parcher & Murphy until he sued his boss (Joely Fisher) for a sexual harassment suit. Other guest star appearances include 8 Simple Rules and Cold Case. He is also known for parts in Special (2006), RewinD (2005) and Spoonaur (2004)

Film credits include The Rules of Attraction and Spoonaur.

External links
 

American male film actors
American male television actors
1979 births
Living people
Date of birth missing (living people)